Zahira El Ghabi is a Moroccan Woman FIDE master (WFM, 2005).

Chess career
In the early 2000s, she was one of the leading Moroccan chess players. In 2000, Zahira El Ghabi participated in Women's World Chess Championship by knock-out system and in the first round lost to Julia Demina.

Zahira El Ghabi played for Morocco in the Women's Chess Olympiads:
 In 2000, at first reserve board in the 34th Chess Olympiad (women) in Istanbul (+6, =1, -0) and won individual gold medal.

Since 2006 she rarely participated in chess tournaments.

References

External links 
 Zahira El Ghabi chess games at 365Chess.com
 

Living people
Moroccan chess players
Year of birth missing (living people)